The 1991 GP Ouest-France was the 55th edition of the GP Ouest-France cycle race and was held on 20 August 1991. The race started and finished in Plouay. The race was won by Armand de Las Cuevas of the Banesto team.

General classification

References

1991
1991 in road cycling
1991 in French sport